Tai Tsing Chau is a village located on the Tsing Chau Tsai Peninsula of Lantau Island, in the Tsuen Wan District of Hong Kong.

Administration
Tai Tsing Chau is a recognized village under the New Territories Small House Policy.

References

Villages in Tsuen Wan District, Hong Kong
Lantau Island